Ondřej Herzán (born 3 March 1981 in Pardubice) is a Czech football midfielder. He currently plays for SK Dynamo České Budějovice.

Career
Herzán started playing professionally in 2001, with Czech team Jablonec. In 2004, he joined Czech giants AC Sparta Prague, where he however failed to break into the first team. In September 2006 he moved to Italy, joining Serie B side Lecce, then guided by fellow Czechman Zdeněk Zeman. In 2007–08 he moved on loan to Verona in the Italian third tier Serie C1, only to leave the scaligeri' in January 2008 to join Serie B club Spezia. In his first stint with the Ligurian side, Herzán featured intermittently, and his club was ultimately relegated at the end of the season, being successively cancelled and admitted to Serie D. Herzán consequently left Italy to try his luck back to Czech Republic with Gambrinus liga club SK Kladno; after only seven appearances with that club, he however moved back to Italy in January 2009, re-joining Spezia in the Lega Pro Seconda Divisione, being part of the team that won promotion to the higher tier, Lega Pro Prima Divisione, in 2009–10.

References

External links
 
 
 USLecce.it 

1981 births
Living people
Czech footballers
Czech Republic youth international footballers
Czech Republic under-21 international footballers
Czech First League players
Serie B players
AFK Atlantic Lázně Bohdaneč players
FK Jablonec players
AC Sparta Prague players
SK Kladno players
U.S. Lecce players
Hellas Verona F.C. players
Sportspeople from Pardubice
Spezia Calcio players
FK Náchod-Deštné players
Expatriate footballers in Italy
Association football midfielders